Rezaabad (also Romanized as Reẕāābād; also known as Rizāābad) is a village in Taraznahid Rural District, in the Central District of Saveh County, Markazi Province, Iran. At the 2006 census, its population was 210, in 52 families.

References 

Populated places in Saveh County